Nicholas Ball (died 1586), of Totnes; later of Dartington, Devon, was an English politician.

He was a Member (MP) of the Parliament of England for Totnes in 1584. He was Mayor of Totnes in 1585–1586.

References

Year of birth missing
1586 deaths
English MPs 1584–1585
Members of the Parliament of England (pre-1707) for Totnes
Mayors of Totnes